Megachile arundinacea is a species of bee in the family Megachilidae. It was described by Taschenberg in 1872.

References

Arundinacea
Insects described in 1872